Line SFM2 is part of the Turin Metropolitan Railway Service. It links Chivasso to Pinerolo, and passes through the city centre.

References

Turin Metropolitan Railway Service